The Naranarāyan Dēv Gadī, named after NarNarayan Dev, is one of the two Gadis (seats) that together form the Swaminarayan Sampraday. Its headquarter is at the Shri Swaminarayan Mandir, Ahmedabad and controls the Uttar Vibhag.

The Acharya of the Gadi is Acharya Shree Koshalendraprasadji Maharaj.

History

In Vadtal, on Prabodhini Ekadashi of Vikram Samvat 1825, Shree Swaminarayan adopted his nephews Ayodhyaprasadji Pande (Son of elder brother Rampratapbhai) and Raghuveerji Pande (Son of younger brother Ichcharambhai) as his sons. Establishing the two Gadis i.e. NarNarayan Dev Gadi, headquartered at Ahmedabad and LaxmiNarayan Dev Gadi, headquartered at Vadtal, Swaminarayan instructed the two cousins to draw lots, to decide who would be seated on which Gadi.

Ayodhyaprasadji was appointed the inaugural Acharya of the NarNarayan Dev Gadi (also known as the Uttar Vibhag - Northern division), whilst Raghuveerji became the inaugural Acharya of the LaxmiNarayan Dev Gadi (also known as the Dakshin Vibhag - Southern division).

The administrative division between the two is set forth in minute detail in a document written by Swaminarayan, called Desh Vibhaag Lekh. The method by which future Acharyas are to be appointed is enshrined in the document Desh Vibhag Lekh.

Swaminarayan then instructed all the followers present to do puja of their respective acharyas.

Organisational structure 

In 1826 at Vadtal, Swaminarayan established the dual Acharyaship in Dharmavanshi Acharyas, whom he intended as his successor. "Dharmavanshi" means "belonging to the lineage of Dharmadev" – the father of Swaminarayan. Swaminarayan enthroned his two adopted sons, Ayodhyaprasad Pande and Raghuvir Pande, who were the sons of his brothers Rampratapji and Ichcharamji, as the spiritual leaders of the Nar Narayan Dev Gadi headquartered at Ahmedabad and the Laxmi Narayan Dev Gadi headquartered at Vadtal respectively. He installed them as the Acharyas for all followers, including householders and ascetics. Swaminarayan gave sole authority to these two individuals to install murtis in temples and to initiate sadhus and householders into the Sampraday. He did this using a legal document known as "Desh Vibhag no Lekh", which he dictated and was written by Shukanand Swami. Learned saints and elder satsangis witnessed this document. Copies were presented to the inaugural Acharyas, Ayodhyaprasad Pande and Raghuvir Pande – these are currently in the possession of the current Acharyas. The document was accepted by the Bombay High Court as the authoritative document regarding the apportionment of the two dioceses, so it has legal standing. Presently, Acharya Maharajshri Rakeshprasadji Maharaj is at the head of Laxmi Narayan Dev Gadi, while Acharya Maharajshri Koshalendraprasadji Maharaj is at the head of the Nar Narayan Dev Gadi at Ahmedabad.

Importance of Acharyas 
Swaminarayan thought that as he had established the temples and the Swaminarayan Sampraday, he wanted to keep his sadhus free from the affairs dealing with wealth, power and other worldly affairs. He decided to create leaders who would subsequently be responsible for the Swaminarayan Sampraday. This led to his decision to appoint his nephews as Acharyas. The constitution of the Sampraday is laid out in Desh Vibhag Lekh which describes in detail the functions of the Acharyas.... it is my command to all sadhus, bhamcharis and all satsangies, that for the purpose of your kalyaan (emancipation) you must obey and follow the two Acharyas of Dharmavansh, and obey their commands by thought, action and speech. If this is compromised and whoever turns elsewhere (rejecting the Acharyas) will find that they will never find sukh (happiness) in this world or the worlds beyond and will experience immense distress ... ― Desh Vibhag LekhThe Acharyas of the Sampraday are administrative heads, spiritual leaders and the gurus of their followers. Since the acharyas are supposed to refrain from contact with the opposite sex, except close relations, the acharyas' wives are the gurus for female members of the sect, and must avoid contact with unfamiliar men. The acharyas wear a red turban, and carry a golden staff and umbrella, the symbols of their authority In the scripture Purushottam Prakash (Nishkulanand Kavya), the writer Nishkulanand Swami describes Swaminarayan's establishment of the Dharmavanshi Acharyas.

The Acharyas are responsible for:

 Initiating followers into the organisation with a Samanya Diksha by giving the guru-mantra
 Initiating monks-sadhus by giving them the Maha-Bhagwadi Diksha
 Perform murti-pratishtha, installing deities in the temples
 Authenticating scriptures of the Sampraday
 Acting as the Guru and leader of the entire Sampraday

These responsibilities are prescribed in the holy texts Shikshapatri, Satsangi Jeevan and Desh Vibhag Lekh, according to which no person other than the Dharmavanshi Acharyas may carry out these duties.

In one of the most authoritative scriptures, the Vachanamrut, Swaminarayan states one of the prerequisites for attaining Akshardham. He wrote, "The devotee who is aashrit of Dharmakul (i.e. he who has received initiation from Dharmavanshi Acharya and remains loyal to the Acharya) gets a divine Bhram-state body by God's wish." It is seen as imperative to be a humble, loyal follower of the Dharmavanshi Acharya once receiving the diksha (guru mantra) in order to achieve a bhram form. In Swamini Vato, Swaminarayan was quoted, "Even Gunatitanand Swami, one of the main sadhus of Swaminarayan states, 'He who insults the temples, Acharyas, sadhus and satsangis will find his roots being destroyed and will inevitably fall from the satsang.'"

Membership 
Male satsangis are initiated by the acharya of the gadi he comes under. Female satsangis are initiated by the wife of the acharya, who is the leader of women in the Swaminarayan Sampraday. In the absence of the acharya, ascetics perform this initiation, which is then confirmed by the acharya on his next visit. The ceremony involves the taking of five vows (panch vartaman): not to commit adultery or robbery, not to consume intoxicants or meat and not to lie. The initiator then pours water over the initiates hands, gives him a Sanskrit shloka, Shri Krishna twam gatirmama, meaning Shri Krishna thou art my refuge. The initiate then offers at least half a rupee to the acharya, who adorns a kanthi thread around the initiate's neck. The initiate is then required to apply the tilak chandlo to his forehead (chandan U and red kum kum dot in the middle). Ladies only apply the red kum kum dot.

There are eight important things in the life of a Satsangi; these are Kanthi – a thread worn around the neck, the Tilak Chandlo – a holy mark, the Mala – a thread with 108 beads, Nitya Pooja – daily prayers, the Temple, Darshan – a form of worship, Aarti – a ceremony, and Vandu Pad and Chesta Pad – verses recited in the temples daily. A Satsangi must show reverence for God, the Shastras, the Acharya of the Gadi the Satsangi comes under (NarNarayan Dev Gadi or LaxmiNarayan Dev Gadi), festivals, elders and be of overall good conduct.

Upon initiation, Satsangi make 11 vows, called Niyams (Rules):

 Be non-violent
 Do not have any kind of relationship with a woman other than your wife
 Do not eat meat, including seafood, poultry products or eggs
 Do not drink products that contain alcohol, including medicines
 Never touch a widow woman whom you do not know
 Never commit suicide in any circumstances
 Do not steal
 Never blame others for something that you may not know about
 Never disparage God, Goddesses, or any religion
 Never eat someone's food who does not follow these eleven rules
 Never listen to holy stories from an atheist.

Ascetics 
From the beginning, ascetics have played a major role in the Swaminarayan Sampraday. They contribute towards growth and development of the movement and towards the salvation of its members. Sadhus, initiated by either Dharmavanshi Acharya, also form an integral part of the organisation and wear only orange robes. The Brahmachari ascetics, who are Brahmins, have a special responsibility of taking care of images in temples. These ascetics wear white robes on their waist and an orange cloth over their shoulder. Ascetics lead a strict life, refraining from worldly pleasures and devoting their lives to the service of the holy fellowship. They preach the philosophy and lifetimes of Swaminarayan and encourage people to follow a pious and religious life. Swaminarayan has stated in the Vachanamrut that the association of Satpurush (true saints/devotees) opens the path to salvation. In 1999, the Ahmedabad Gadi had 765 male ascetics and the Vadtal Gadi 1468 male ascetics.

The first rule of becoming an ascetic (sanyasi) of the sect is never to come in contact with the opposite sex, or money. Ascetics are not allowed to leave the temple alone; they have to move out in pairs. Even in the temple, while using the toilet, they must do so in pairs to ensure they keep their vows. The food they eat must be mixed up so that they may not taste it.

Female ascetics, known as Samkhya yoginis, receive initiation from the Gadiwala, or wife of the Acharya. They stay within the temple, follow ascetic rules strictly, wear dark red clothing and stay in the temple Haveli. They take care of the images in women's temples and conduct discourses for women. In 1999, the Ahmedabad Gadi had 440 female ascetics and the Vadtal Gadi had 115 female ascetics.

Acharyas

The following table lists all the Acharyas of the Ahmedabad Gadi till date.

Subordinate Organisations
Organisations under the NarNarayan Dev Gadi.

ISSO

The now nivrut Acharya of the Ahmedabad gaadi (who was then Acharya), Acharya Shree Tejendraprasadji Maharaj founded International Swaminarayan Satsang Organisation (I.S.S.O.) in the United States on the occasion of Vijaya Dashmi in the year 1978. The prime objective of I.S.S.O. is "To advance the Sanatan Dharma, in accordance with the principles and teachings of the Swaminarayan Sampraday, founded and ordained by Sahajanand Swami", enabling Swaminarayan's devotees from both the Nar Narayan Dev Gadi (Ahmedabad) & Laxmi Narayan Dev Gadi (Vadtal) to practice their religious duties in harmony.

This achieved, the efforts of all the followers of the Sampraday can be polarised, allowing for joint activities to be undertaken. In turn, this will enabling followers to meet the challenges that they are faced with today in giving their youth a religious experience that they can understand and practice themselves.

ISSO Seva 

In 2001 ISSO-Seva was established. It is an independent running charity under the Swaminarayan Sampraday to give a helping hand to mankind, to help the homeless and needy as well as making awareness about the modern day diseases and infections. It provides relief for when a natural disaster strikes worldwide. The charity is run by professionals and volunteers of the Swaminarayan temples and centres.

NNDYM

Narnarayan Dev Yuvak Mandal is a youth organisation which was founded by Acharya Shree Koshalendraprasadji Maharaj (Pre Acharya Status) in 1994 with its headquarters at the Shri Swaminarayan Mandir, Ahmedabad and was created to help young people to confront the challenges of human life.

This step set into motion various initiatives by this organisation to build a foundation of young people across the globe. The organisation propagates dharma (duty), bhakti (devotion), gnaan (knowledge), and vairagya (detachment from maya).

Organisations within Swaminarayan Sampraday 

In 1978, the Acharya of the Ahmedabad gadi, Tejendraprasadji Maharaj, founded the International Swaminarayan Satsang Organisation (ISSO) in the United States on the occasion of Vijaya Dasami. The prime objective of ISSO is, "To advance the Sanatan Dharma, in accordance with the principles and teachings of the Swaminarayan Sampraday, founded and ordained by Sahajanand Swami", enabling Swaminarayan's devotees from both the Nar Narayan Dev Gadi (Ahmedabad) and Laxmi Narayan Dev Gadi (Vadtal) to practice their religious duties in harmony.

In 2001, ISSO-Seva, an independently run charity under the Swaminarayan Sampraday was established to help mankind, the homeless and needy and promote awareness about modern day diseases and infections. It provides relief after natural disasters worldwide. The charity is run by professionals and volunteers of the Swaminarayan temples and centres.

Narnarayan Dev Yuvak Mandal (NNDYM) is a youth organisation which was founded by Koshalendraprasadji Maharaj in his Acharya status in 1994. Its headquarters are at the Swaminarayan Mandir in Ahmedabad; it was created to help young people to confront the challenges of human life. This organisation has various initiatives to build a foundation of young people across the globe. It propagates duty, devotion, knowledge (gnaan) and detachment from illusion (maya).

The International Swaminarayan Satsang Mandal (ISSM) is an organisation based in United States that comes under the Laxminarayan Dev Gadi, Vadtal. It has several temples in the US, all of which are named Vadtal Dham after the parent organisation.

Recent developments

Swaminarayan Museum 

Swaminarayan Museum in Ahmedabad, which houses more than 5000 artefacts, was opened in March 2011. The museum holds items such as Swaminarayan's writing scripts, day to day garments and ornaments. This is the first project in the Swaminarayan Sampraday that aims to acquire all of Swaminarayan's Prasadi items from temples across the world. This museum is a dream of the retired acharya of Ahmedabad, Tejendraprasad Pande.

See also 

 Swaminarayan
 Swaminarayan Sampraday

References

Bibliography
 
 
 Desh Vibhag Lekh
 Acharyas of the Swaminarayan Sampraday
 Dharmakul

External links
 Swaminarayan Live Darshan
How Swaminarayan Sampraday is Vaidic with citations
Miraculous acts by Lord Swaminarayan in Hindi - Charitra in Hindi
Swaminarayan Non Stop Prabhatiya by Nand Santo
Swaminarayan Nitya Niyam - Daily night Prartha to sung by all Satsangies

Swaminarayan Sampradaya